A tin tabernacle, also known as an iron church, is a type of prefabricated ecclesiastical building made from corrugated galvanised iron. They were developed in the mid-19th century initially in the United Kingdom. Corrugated iron was first used for roofing in London in 1829 by civil engineer Henry Robinson Palmer, and the patent was later sold to Richard Walker who advertised "portable buildings for export" in 1832. The technology for producing the corrugated sheets improved, and to prevent corrosion, the sheets were galvanised with a coating of zinc, a process developed by Stanislas Sorel in Paris in the 1830s. After 1850, many types of prefabricated buildings were produced, including churches, chapels and mission halls.

History

The Industrial Revolution was a time of great population expansion and movement in Europe. Towns and cities expanded as the workforce moved into the new industrial areas resulting in the building of more than 4,000 churches during the mid 19th century and an upsurge of nonconformism led to a demand for even more buildings. The Church of England, influenced by Pugin, the Cambridge Camden Society and John Ruskin, was initially sceptical about corrugated iron buildings. However, manufacturers found other markets, notably in the colonies of the British Empire where 19 such churches were erected in Melbourne, Australia alone by 1851. A  church built entirely of cast and wrought iron clad in corrugated iron was built in Jamaica at a cost of £1,000. William Morris, founder of the Arts and Crafts Movement, wrote a pamphlet in 1890 decrying the construction of corrugated iron buildings "that were spreading like a pestilence over the country."

Churches, chapels and mission halls were built in new industrial areas, pit villages, near railway works and in more isolated rural and coastal locations. Landowners or employers frequently donated plots of land and sometimes donated the cost of the building, although many were funded by public subscription. The 3rd Marquess of Bute provided the first Roman Catholic cathedral to be erected in Oban in 1886. It was lavishly decorated and furnished and lasted for 50 years until it was replaced.

Early tin churches were easily erected, but at an average cost of between £2 and £4 per sitting, were expensive. St Mark's Church in Birkenhead, built in 1867, cost more than £2,000 for 500 seats. Prices decreased to almost £1 per sitting towards the end of the century. David Rowell & Co's 1901 catalogue advertised a church to seat 400 persons, delivered to the nearest railway station and erected on the purchaser's foundation, at a cost of £360. Isaac Dixon's 1896 catalogue mentioned the company had supplied nearly 150 churches over the previous ten years and the price had dropped from 35 shillings to 20 shillings (£1.75 to £1) per sitting plus the cost of foundations, heating and lighting which could add another £70 for a church to seat 200.

Several tin tabernacles survive as places of worship; some have listed building status and some have been converted to other uses. Some redundant chapels have been moved to museums for preservation. St Chad's Mission Church was moved from near Telford to the Ironbridge Gorge Museum Trust's Blists Hill Victorian Town in Shropshire, while St Saviour's Church from Westhouses in Derbyshire may be seen at the Midland Railway Centre's Swanwick Junction site. St Margaret's Church from South Wonston, near Winchester, Hampshire, is now located at the Weald and Downland Open Air Museum in West Sussex.

Manufacturers

Several firms, such as David Rowell & Co., Humphrey's and Frederick Braby in London, Isaac Dixon and Co and Francis Morton in Liverpool, E T Bellhouse in Manchester and A & J Main & Co of Glasgow manufactured a range of iron buildings that included houses, village halls, sports pavilions, warehouses, hospital wards, chapels and churches. Many of their products were exported to Canada, Africa, and to California and Australia during the gold rushes. Other manufacturers of corrugated iron churches in Glasgow included Braby & Company and R. R. Speirs who supplied 75 churches between 1908 and 1914. Corrugated iron buildings were exhibited at the Great Exhibition in 1851. Isaac Dixon's 1874 catalogue was aimed at the landed gentry, railway proprietors and shippers while Francis Morton's company had a dedicated church building department and its 1879 catalogue reported nearly 70 churches, chapels and school houses built in the United Kingdom.

Churches and chapels

England

Scotland

Wales

Ireland

New Zealand

Australia

References
Citations

Bibliography

Further reading

External links

 Tin Tabernacles Churches, Chapels & Mission Halls in Britain
 Photographic record of Tin Tabernacles in the UK
 BBC Radio 4 programme on Tin Tabernacles

Architecture in the United Kingdom
Buildings and structures in the United Kingdom
Iron and steel buildings
Prefabricated buildings
Church architecture